The Giant Swing is a religious structure in Sao Chingcha Subdistrict, Phra Nakhon District, Bangkok, Thailand. Located in front of Wat Suthat, it was formerly used in an old Brahmin ceremony, and is one of Bangkok's tourist attractions.

History

The Giant Swing was constructed in 1784 in front of the Devasathan shrine by King Rama I. During the reign of Rama II the swing ceremony was discontinued as the swing had become structurally damaged by lightning. In 1920 it was renovated and moved to its current location in order to make space for a gas plant. The ceremony was again performed until 1935, when it was discontinued after several fatal accidents.

The last renovations were done in 1959, and after 45 years of exposure to the elements the wooden pillars were showing signs of serious damage. A major reconstruction began in April 2005. Six teak tree trunks were used. The two used for the main structure of the swing are over 3.5 m in circumference and over 30m in height. The remaining four are used for support and are 2.30 m in circumference and 20 m in height. The swing was taken down in late October 2006 and the work finished in December of the same year. The rebuilt swing was dedicated in royal ceremonies presided over by King Bhumibol Adulyadej in September 2007. The timbers of the original swing are preserved in the Bangkok National Museum.

In 2005, the Giant Swing, together with Wat Suthat, was proposed as a future UNESCO World Heritage site.

Surroundings

Wat Suthat Thep Wararam

Wat Suthat Thep Wararam, commonly shortened to "Wat Suthat", is an important temple in Thailand. Inside the grand hall is a Phra Sri Sagaya Munee, its principal Buddha image which was acquired from Wat Mahathat in Sukhothai. Wat Suthat was built by King Rama I in the center of his capital, but it was completed in the reign of Rama III. Many people often make pilgrimages to worship the Buddha especially on holy days such as Visakha Bucha Day and Magha Bucha Day.

Sarn Choa Po Seu or Tiger God Shrine

In the quarter there is also a well known and high regarded Chinese shrine, Sarn Choa Po Seu ('tiger shrine'). Originally it was a building on Bamrungmueng Road where the big Chinese communities were. Later, King Rama V expanded the road and had the shrine relocated to the current location on Ta Nao Road near WatMahanaparam. The site is a place of worship for Thai and Chinese people seeking success in career, money, love, and infant fertility.

It was built in King Rama III reign which is 1834 and now.. Tiger God Shrine is one of the most ancient and famous shrines in Thailand.  Moreover, this shrine has beautiful interior design and has some antiquities. Most people come to pay respect to "Tua Lao Aie", a Chinese God to have good fortune, especially on Chinese New Year's Day.

Lan Kon Mueng (Townspeople Plaza)
At the heart of the quarter is LanKonMueng in front of city hall. Every morning and evening, this is the recreational area of the locals where they can exercise such as dance aerobics, jogging, stroll around, gather or just relax, bring children or pets out for a walk and enjoy the breeze.

Devasathan

Devasathan Shrine is the most important religious and ancient place for Brahmin-Hindu in Thailand. It was built in 1784. which is in King Rama I's reign. According to ancient tradition, it was built for holding officiating religious ceremony in the past. Devasathan Shrine has three important sanctuaries which are Shiva sanctuary, Ganesha sanctuary, and Narayana sanctuary.

Vishu Temple
The small temple of Lord Vishnu on Unakan Road beside of Wat Suthat. This temple was built in 1982 on the 250th anniversary of Rattanakosin by the Association of Indian-Thai Chamber of Commerce as a sign of good relations between Thailand and India. The Vishnu idol was brought from India.

Swing ceremony

An annual swinging ceremony known as Triyampavai-Tripavai was held at Giant Swings of major cities until 1935, when it was abolished for safety reasons. The name of the ceremony was derived from the names of two Tamil language Hindu chants: Thiruvempavai (a Shaivite hymn by Manikkavasakar) and Thiruppavai (a Vaishnavite hymn by Andal). Among Thai people, the ceremony was popularly known as Lo Jin Ja or Lo-Chin-Cha ("pulling the swing"). It is known that Tamil verses from Thiruvempavai — poet pratu sivalai ("opening the portals of Shiva's home") — were recited at this ceremony, as well as the coronation ceremony of the Thai king. According to T.P. Meenakshisundaram, the name of the festival indicates that Thiruppavai might have been recited as well.

According to an ancient Hindu epic, after Brahma created the world he sent Shiva to look after it. When Shiva descended to the earth, Naga serpents wrapped around the mountains in order to keep the earth in place. After Shiva found the earth solid, the Nagas moved to the seas in celebration. The Swing Ceremony was a re-enactment of this. The pillars of the Giant Swing represented the mountains, while the circular base of the swing represented the earth and the seas. In the ceremony Brahmins would swing, trying to grab a bag of coins placed on one of the pillars.

See also
 Hongsalmun, gate in Korean architecture
 Iljumun, first gate of Korean Buddhist temple
 Paifang, Chinese architectural arch or gateway structure
 Shanmen, gate of Chinese Buddhist temple 
 Tam quan, gate of Vietnamese temple
 Torii, Japanese gate found at the entrance of or within a Shinto shrine

References

External links
 
Information from the Bangkok Tourism Division
Newspaper article on the 2005 restoration
Brahminism in Thailand
2Bangkok on the 2005 renovation

Buildings and structures in Bangkok
Tourist attractions in Bangkok
Hindu studies
Phra Nakhon district
Road junctions in Bangkok
Registered ancient monuments in Bangkok